This is a list of Idaho wildlife management areas. The U.S. state of Idaho current has 32 wildlife management areas, all managed by the Idaho Department of Fish and Game. Wildlife management areas (WMA) are established to protect habitat for wildlife and provide opportunities for hunting, fishing, and other public enjoyment of wildlife. The species of interest for each WMA varies from big game, such as elk, moose, and mule and white-tailed deer, to upland game (such as ring-necked pheasant) and waterfowl, including a variety of ducks and Canada geese.

List of WMAs

References

 L
Wildlife management areas
Wildlife
Wildlife management areas
Idaho
Idaho
Wildlife management areas
Idaho